Nadipudi is a village in Amalapuram Mandal, Dr. B.R. Ambedkar Konaseema district in the state of Andhra Pradesh in India.

Geography 

Demographics 
 India census, Nadipudi had a population of 3042, out of which 1558 were male and 1484 were female. The population of children below 6 years of age was 9%. The literacy rate of the village was 86%.

References 

Villages in Amalapuram Mandal